In Greek mythology, Polyidus (Polúeidos means 'seeing many things') may refer to three distinct characters. The name also means "much beauty", from polus, "many, much" and eidos, "form, appearance, beauty".

 Polyidus, a Corinthian seer and descendant of Melampus.
 Polyidus, the Trojan son of Eurydamas and brother of Abas. He was a reader of dreams and an old man at the time of the Trojan War. Polyidus was killed by the Argive hero Diomedes.
 Polyidus, one of the Suitors of Penelope who came from Dulichium along with other 56 wooers. He, with the other suitors, was shot dead by Odysseus with the help of Eumaeus, Philoetius, and Telemachus.

Notes

References 

 Apollodorus, The Library with an English Translation by Sir James George Frazer, F.B.A., F.R.S. in 2 Volumes, Cambridge, MA, Harvard University Press; London, William Heinemann Ltd. 1921. ISBN 0-674-99135-4. Online version at the Perseus Digital Library. Greek text available from the same website.
 Homer, The Iliad with an English Translation by A.T. Murray, Ph.D. in two volumes. Cambridge, MA., Harvard University Press; London, William Heinemann, Ltd. 1924. . Online version at the Perseus Digital Library.
 Homer, Homeri Opera in five volumes. Oxford, Oxford University Press. 1920. . Greek text available at the Perseus Digital Library.
 Pausanias, Description of Greece with an English Translation by W.H.S. Jones, Litt.D., and H.A. Ormerod, M.A., in 4 Volumes. Cambridge, MA, Harvard University Press; London, William Heinemann Ltd. 1918. . Online version at the Perseus Digital Library
 Pausanias, Graeciae Descriptio. 3 vols. Leipzig, Teubner. 1903.  Greek text available at the Perseus Digital Library.

Trojans
People of the Trojan War
Suitors of Penelope